Weird Tales is American band Golden Smog's second album, released in 1998. The title comes from the pulp magazine Weird Tales; the cover art, by Margaret Brundage, is from the October 1933 issue.

Reception

Writing for AllMusic, music critic Michael Gallucci wrote of the album "...as expected, the best songwriters here (Gary Louris of the Jayhawks and Wilco's Jeff Tweedy) contribute Weird Tales' most solid tracks. A pet project aimed more toward fans of the genre than the casual listener, Golden Smog nonetheless deliver the goods with a good deal of twangy heart and soul." Joshua Klein of The A.V. Club wrote the album "reveals that even a musical goof-off can develop into a potent band in its own right." and called it "a first-rate collaboration that's unified in both vision and spirit." The Washington Post called the group's sound "melodic, economical -- if not especially ambitious -- country-rock."

Track listing
 "To Call My Own" (Dan Murphy) – 3:31
 "Looking Forward to Seeing You" (Kraig Johnson) – 2:47
 "Until You Came Along" (Gary Louris) – 4:59
 "Lost Love" (Jeff Tweedy) – 3:00
 "If I Only Had a Car" (Johnson, Louris) – 4:03
 "Jane" (Louris, Marc Perlman) – 4:29
 "Keys" (Johnson, Louris) – 3:28
 "I Can't Keep From Talking" (Tweedy) – 3:50
 "Reflections on Me" (Murphy) – 2:53
 "Making Waves" (Johnson) – 4:01
 "White Shell Road" (Louris) – 4:14
 "Please Tell My Brother" (Tweedy) – 2:10
 "Fear of Falling" (Jody Stephens, Louris, Tweedy) – 3:31
 "All the Same to Me" (Sparks, Tweedy) – 3:05
 "Jennifer Save Me" (Louris, Johnson) – 5:47

Personnel
Jeff Tweedy – vocals, guitar, bass guitar, harmonica, percussion
Gary Louris – vocals, guitar, organ, Mellotron, background vocals
Dan Murphy  – vocals, guitar, piano, drums, background vocals, Mellotron, Wurlitzer
Kraig Johnson  – vocals, guitar, bass guitar, piano, background vocals
Marc Perlman – guitar, bass guitar, background vocals
Jody Stephens – drums, percussion, bells
Jim Dickinson – Wurlitzer
Jessy Greene – violin, background vocals
Jim Boquist – background vocals
Jason Orris – background vocals
Bryan Hanna – tambourine, background vocals
Brian Paulson – Minimoog
Production notes
Brian Paulson – producer
Jason Orris – engineer
Bryan Hanna – engineer
Pete Matthews – engineer, assistant engineer
Jim Scott – mixing
Mike Scotella – mixing assistant
Steve Marcusson – mastering

Chart positions

References 

1998 albums
Golden Smog albums
Albums produced by Brian Paulson
Rykodisc albums